Belliard is a surname. Notable people with the name include:

 Augustin Daniel Belliard (1769–1832), French general
 David Belliard (born 1978), French journalist and politician
 Michel Belliard (born 1949), French boxer
 Rafael Belliard (born 1969), Dominican baseball player and coach
 Ronnie Belliard (born 1979), American baseball player

See also
 Édouard Béliard (1832–1912), French Impressionist painter
 Robert Béliard (1912–1993), French racing cyclist
 Rue Belliard, a street in Brussels, Belgium
 L'Église de la rue Belliard, a Brussels-based evangelical Protestant congregation